The International Finance Corporation (IFC) is an international financial institution that offers investment, advisory, and asset-management services to encourage private-sector development in less developed countries. The IFC is a member of the World Bank Group and is headquartered in Washington, D.C. in the United States.

It was established in 1956, as the private-sector arm of the World Bank Group, to advance economic development by investing in for-profit and commercial projects for poverty reduction and promoting development. The IFC's stated aim is to create opportunities for people to escape poverty and achieve better living standards by mobilizing financial resources for private enterprise, promoting accessible and competitive markets, supporting businesses and other private-sector entities, and creating jobs and delivering necessary services to those who are poverty stricken or otherwise vulnerable.

Since 2009, the IFC has focused on a set of development goals that its projects are expected to target. Its goals are to increase sustainable agriculture opportunities, improve healthcare and education, increase access to financing for microfinance and business clients, advance infrastructure, help small businesses grow revenues, and invest in climate health.

The IFC is owned and governed by its member countries but has its own executive leadership and staff that conduct its normal business operations. It is a corporation whose shareholders are member governments that provide paid-in capital and have the right to vote on its matters. Originally, it was more financially integrated with the World Bank Group, but later, the IFC was established separately and eventually became authorized to operate as a financially autonomous entity and make independent investment decisions.

It offers an array of debt and equity financing services and helps companies face their risk exposures while refraining from participating in a management capacity. The corporation also offers advice to companies on making decisions, evaluating their impact on the environment and society, and being responsible. It advises governments on building infrastructure and partnerships to further support private sector development.

The corporation is assessed by an independent evaluator each year. In 2011, its evaluation report recognized that its investments performed well and reduced poverty, but recommended that the corporation define poverty and expected outcomes more explicitly to better-understand its effectiveness and approach poverty reduction more strategically. The corporation's total investments in 2011 amounted to $18.66 billion. It committed $820 million to advisory services for 642 projects in 2011, and held $24.5 billion worth of liquid assets. The IFC is in good financial standing and received the highest ratings from two independent credit rating agencies in 2018.

IFC comes under frequent criticism from NGOs that it is not able to track its money because of its use of financial intermediaries. For example, a report by Oxfam International and other NGOs in 2015, "The Suffering of Others," found the IFC was not performing enough due diligence and managing risk in many of its investments in third-party lenders.

Other criticism focuses on IFC working excessively with large companies or wealthy individuals already able to finance their investments without help from public institutions such as IFC, and such investments do not have an adequate positive development impact. An example often cited by NGOs and critical journalists is IFC granting financing to a Saudi prince for a five-star hotel in Ghana.

History

The World Bank and International Monetary Fund were designed by delegates at the Bretton Woods conference in 1944. The World Bank, then consisting of only the International Bank for Reconstruction and Development, became operational in 1946. Robert L. Garner joined the World Bank in 1947 as a senior executive and expressed his view that private business could play an important role in international development. In 1950, Garner and his colleagues proposed establishing a new institution for the purpose of making private investments in the less developed countries served by the World Bank. The U.S. government encouraged the idea of an international corporation working in tandem with the World Bank to invest in private enterprises without accepting guarantees from governments, without managing those enterprises, and by collaborating with third party investors. When describing the IFC in 1955, World Bank President Eugene R. Black said that the IFC would only invest in private firms, rather than make loans to governments, and it would not manage the projects in which it invests.

The concept was nonetheless controversial in the US, where some business interests were uncomfortable with the public ownership of private firms.  Nonetheless, in 1956, the International Finance Corporation became operational under the leadership of Garner. It initially had 12 staff members and $100 million (equivalent to $ million in ) in capital. The corporation made its inaugural investment in 1957 by making a $2 million (equivalent to $ million in ) loan to a Brazil-based affiliate of Siemens & Halske (now Siemens AG).

In 2007, IFC bought 18% stake in the Indian Financial firm, Angel Broking. In December 2015, IFC supported Greek banks with 150 million euros by buying shares in four of them: Alpha Bank (60 million), Eurobank (50 million), Piraeus Bank (20 million) and National Bank of Greece (20 million).

Governance
The IFC is governed by its Board of Governors which meets annually and consists of one governor per member country (most often the country's finance minister or treasury secretary). Each member typically appoints one governor and also one alternate. Although corporate authority rests with the Board of Governors, the governors delegate most of their corporate powers and their authority over daily matters such as lending and business operations to the board of directors. The IFC's Board of Directors consists of 25 executive directors who meet regularly and work at the IFC's headquarters, and is chaired by the President of the World Bank Group. The executive directors collectively represent all 186 member countries. When the IFC's Board of Directors votes on matters brought before it, each executive director's vote is weighted according to the total share capital of the member countries represented by that director.

IFC is currently led by Makhtar Diop who was appointed as the institution's Managing Director and Executive Vice President in February 2021.  Prior to this appointment, he was the World Bank's Vice President for Infrastructure, where he led the Bank's global efforts to build sustainable infrastructure in developing and emerging economies.

Although the IFC coordinates its activities in many areas with the other World Bank Group institutions, it generally operates independently as it is a separate entity with legal and financial autonomy, established by its own Articles of Agreement. The corporation operates with a staff of over 3,400 employees, of which half are stationed in field offices across its member nations.

Functions

Investment services
The IFC's investment services consist of loans, equity, trade finance, syndicated loans, structured and securitized finance, client risk management services, treasury services, and liquidity management. In its fiscal year 2010, the IFC invested $12.7 billion in 528 projects across 103 countries. Of that total investment commitment, approximately 39% ($4.9 billion) was invested into 255 projects across 58 member nations of the World Bank's International Development Association (IDA).

The IFC makes loans to businesses and private projects generally with maturities of seven to twelve years. It determines a suitable repayment schedule and grace period for each loan individually to meet borrowers' currency and cash flow requirements. The IFC may provide longer-term loans or extend grace periods if a project is deemed to warrant it. Leasing companies and financial intermediaries may also receive loans from the IFC.

Though loans have traditionally been denominated in hard currencies, the IFC has endeavored to structure loan products in local currencies. Its disbursement portfolio included loans denominated in 25 local currencies in 2010, and 45 local currencies in 2011, funded largely through swap markets. Local financial markets development is one of IFC's strategic focus areas. In line with its AAA rating, it has strict concentration, liquidity, asset-liability and other policies. The IFC committed to approximately $5.7 billion in new loans in 2010, and $5 billion in 2011.

Although the IFC's shareholders initially only allowed it to make loans, the IFC was authorized in 1961 to make equity investments, the first of which was made in 1962 by taking a stake in FEMSA, a former manufacturer of auto parts in Spain that is now part of Bosch Spain. The IFC invests in businesses' equity either directly or via private-equity funds, generally from five up to twenty percent of a company's total equity. IFC's private-equity portfolio currently stands at roughly $3.0 billion committed to about 180 funds. The portfolio is widely distributed across all regions including Africa, East Asia, South Asia, Eastern Europe, Latin America and the Middle East, and recently has invested in Small Enterprise Assistance Funds' (SEAF) Caucasus Growth Fund, Aureos Capital's Kula Fund II (Papua New Guinea, Fiji, Pacific Islands) and Leopard Capital’s Haiti Fund. Other equity investments made by the IFC include preferred equity, convertible loans, and participation loans. The IFC prefers to invest for the long-term, usually for a period of eight to fifteen years, before exiting through the sale of shares on a domestic stock exchange, usually as part of an initial public offering. When the IFC invests in a company, it does not assume an active role in management of the company.

Through its Global Trade Finance Program, the IFC guarantees trade payment obligations of more than 200 approved banks in over 80 countries to mitigate risk for international transactions. The Global Trade Finance Program provides guarantees to cover payment risks for emerging market banks regarding promissory notes, bills of exchange, letters of credit, bid and performance bonds, supplier credit for capital goods imports, and advance payments. The IFC issued $3.46 billion in more than 2,800 guarantees in 2010, of which over 51% targeted IDA member nations. In its fiscal year 2011, the IFC issued $4.6 billion in more than 3,100 guarantees. In 2009, the IFC launched a separate program for crisis response, known as its Global Trade Liquidity Program, which provides liquidity for international trade among less developed countries. Since its establishment in 2009, the Global Trade Liquidity Program assisted with over $15 billion in trade in 2011.

The IFC operates a Syndicated Loan Program in an effort to mobilize capital for development goals. The program was created in 1957 and  has channeled approximately $38 billion from over 550 financial institutions toward development projects in over 100 different emerging markets. The IFC syndicated a total of $4.7 billion in loans in 2011, twice that of its $2 billion worth of syndications in 2010. Due to banks retrenching from lending across borders in emerging markets, in 2009 the IFC started to syndicate parallel loans to the international financial institutions and other participants.

To service clients without ready access to low-cost financing, the IFC relies on structured or securitized financial products such as partial credit guarantees, portfolio risk transfers, and Islamic finance. The IFC committed $797 million in the form of structured and securitized financing in 2010. For companies that face difficulty in obtaining financing due to a perception of high credit risk, the IFC securitizes assets with predictable cash flows, such as mortgages, credit cards, loans, corporate debt instruments, and revenue streams, in an effort to enhance those companies' credit.

Financial derivative products are made available to the IFC's clients strictly for hedging interest rate risk, exchange rate risk, and commodity risk exposure. It serves as an intermediary between emerging market businesses and international derivatives market makers to increase access to risk management instruments.

The IFC fulfills a treasury role by borrowing international capital to fund lending activities. It is usually one of the first institutions to issue bonds or to do swaps in emerging markets denominated in those markets' local currencies. The IFC's new international borrowings amounted to $8.8 billion in 2010 and $9.8 billion in 2011. The IFC Treasury actively engages in liquidity management in an effort to maximize returns and assure that funding for its investments is readily available while managing risks to the IFC.

Advisory services
In addition to its investment activities the IFC provides a range of advisory services to support corporate decision-making regarding business, environment, social impact, and sustainability. The IFC's corporate advice targets governance, managerial capacity, scalability, and corporate responsibility. It prioritizes the encouragement of reforms that improve the trade friendliness and ease of doing business in an effort to advise countries on fostering a suitable investment climate. It also offers advice to governments on infrastructure development and public-private partnerships. The IFC attempts to guide businesses toward more sustainable practices particularly with regards to having good governance, supporting women in business, and proactively combating climate change. The International Finance Corporation has stated that cities in emerging markets can attract more than $29 trillion in climate-related sectors by 2030.

Asset management company
The IFC established IFC Asset Management Company LLC (IFC AMC) in 2009 as a wholly owned subsidiary to manage all capital funds to be invested in emerging markets. The AMC manages capital mobilized by the IFC as well as by third parties such as sovereign or pension funds, and other development financing organizations. Despite being owned by the IFC, the AMC has investment decision autonomy and is charged with a fiduciary responsibility to the four individual funds under its management. It also aims to mobilize additional capital for IFC investments as it can make certain types of investments which the IFC cannot. , the AMC managed the IFC Capitalization Fund (Equity) Fund, L.P., the IFC Capitalization (Subordinated Debt) Fund, L.P., the IFC African, Latin American, and Caribbean Fund, L.P., and the Africa Capitalization Fund, Ltd. The IFC Capitalization (Equity) Fund holds $1.3 billion in equity, while the IFC Capitalization (Subordinated Debt) Fund is valued at $1.7 billion. The IFC African, Latin American, and Caribbean Fund (referred to as the IFC ALAC Fund) was created in 2010 and is worth $1 billion. , the ALAC Fund has invested a total of $349.1 million into twelve businesses. The Africa Capitalization Fund was set up in 2011 to invest in commercial banks in both Northern and Sub-Saharan Africa and its commitments totaled $181.8 million in March 2012. , Marcos Brujis serves as CEO of the AMC.

Financial performance
The IFC prepares consolidated financial statements in accordance with United States GAAP which are audited by KPMG. It reported income before grants to IDA members of $2.18 billion in fiscal year 2011, up from $1.95 billion in fiscal 2010 and $299 million in fiscal 2009. The increase in income before grants is ascribed to higher earnings from the IFC's investments and also from higher service fees. The IFC reported a partial offset from lower liquid asset trading income, higher administrative costs, and higher advisory service expenses. The IFC made $600 million in grants to IDA countries in fiscal 2011, up from $200 million in fiscal 2010 and $450 million in fiscal 2009. The IFC reported a net income of $1.58 billion in fiscal year 2011. In previous years, the IFC had reported a net loss of $151 million in fiscal 2009 and $1.75 billion in fiscal 2010. The IFC's total capital amounted to $20.3 billion in 2011, of which $2.4 billion was paid-in capital from member countries, $16.4 billion was retained earnings, and $1.5 billion was accumulated other comprehensive income. The IFC held $68.49 billion in total assets in 2011.

The IFC's return on average assets (GAAP basis) decreased from 3.1% in 2010 to 2.4% in 2011. Its return on average capital (GAAP basis) decreased from 10.1% in 2010 to 8.2% in 2011. The IFC's cash and liquid investments accounted for 83% of its estimated net cash requirements for fiscal years 2012 through 2014. Its external funding liquidity level grew from 190% in 2010 to 266% in 2011. It has a 2.6:1 debt-to-equity ratio and holds 6.6% in reserves against losses on loans to its disbursement portfolio. The IFC's deployable strategic capital decreased from 14% in 2010 to 10% in 2011 as a share of its total resources available, which grew from $16.8 billion in 2010 to $17.9 billion in 2011.

In 2011, the IFC reported total funding commitments (consisting of loans, equity, guarantees, and client risk management) of $12.18 billion, slightly lower than its $12.66 billion in commitments in 2010. Its core mobilization, which consists of participation and parallel loans, structured finance, its Asset Management Company funds, and other initiatives, grew from $5.38 billion in 2010 to $6.47 billion in 2011. The IFC's total investment program was reported at a value of $18.66 billion for fiscal year 2011. Its advisory services portfolio included 642 projects valued at $820 million in 2011, compared to 736 projects at $859 million in 2010. The IFC held $24.5 billion in liquid assets in 2011, up from $21 billion in 2010.

The IFC received credit ratings of AAA from Standard & Poor's in December 2012 and AAA from Moody's Investors Service in November 2012. S&P rated the IFC as having a strong financial standing with adequate capital and liquidity, cautious management policies, a high level of geographic diversification, and anticipated treatment as a preferred creditor given its membership in the World Bank Group. It noted that the IFC faces a weakness relative to other multilateral institutions of having higher risks due to its mandated emphasis on private sector investing and its income heavily affected by equity markets.

Sustainability
IFC Sustainability Framework articulates IFC's  commitment to sustainable development and is part of its approach to risk management. IFC's Environmental and social policies, guidelines, and tools are widely adopted as market standards and embedded in operational policies by corporations, investors, financial intermediaries, stock exchanges, regulators, and countries. In particular, the EHS Guidelines contain the performance levels and measures that are normally acceptable to the World Bank Group, and that are generally considered to be achievable in new facilities at reasonable costs by existing technology.

Green buildings in less developed countries
The IFC has created a mass-market certification system for fast growing emerging markets called EDGE ("Excellence in Design for Greater Efficiencies"). IFC and the World Green Building Council have partnered to accelerate green building growth in less developed counties. The target is to scale up green buildings over a seven-year period until 20% of the property market is saturated. Certification occurs when the EDGE standard is met, which requires 20% less energy, water, and materials than conventional homes.

See also
Environment, Health and Safety
Global Environment Facility
Grassroots Business Fund
Multilateral Investment Guarantee Agency
Jam v. International Finance Corp. (2019) - a United States Supreme Court case in which Indians in Gujarat sued the IFC for damages caused by an IFC-funded coal plant
Architecture of Washington, D.C.

References

External links

IFC Articles of Agreement archived from the original on 22 November 2015

International F
International development agencies
International banking institutions
International finance institutions
United Nations Development Group
Non-profit organizations based in Washington, D.C.
Organizations established in 1956
Intergovernmental organizations established by treaty